Alexandra (Ali) Chalupa (Ukrainian: Олександра Чалупа) is an American lawyer who was co-chair of the Democratic National Committee’s (DNC's) Ethnic Council.  She is also the founder of the political consulting firm Chalupa & Associates, LLC.

Chalupa is a pro-Ukrainian activist. Prominent supporters of President Donald Trump have promoted the theory that Chalupa's past activities were part of a conspiracy between the DNC and the Ukrainian government to undermine Trump's campaign and, later, to frame the Russian government for the hacking of the DNC during the 2016 US presidential campaign.

Early life 
Chalupa was born in Davis, California, to Tanya Keis and Leo M. Chalupa, both Ukrainian immigrants. Tanya was born in a United Nations refugee camp in Heidenheim, Germany after World War II. Tanya's and Leo's parents brought them to the United States as children seeking asylum from the Soviet Union, and they grew up in the Bronx, New York. As a couple, they moved to California, where Leo earned a PhD in neuroscience from UCLA and became a professor at UC Davis.

When Chalupa was 2–1/2, her life was saved by a child car seat when her parents' car spun out of control and crashed while traversing the Alps in Italy. The incident led her mother to single-handedly wage a successful 2-year lobbying campaign in the California legislature for a mandatory child safety seat law that passed in 1982.
 
Chalupa attended Davis Senior High School, pursued peace and conflict studies at UC Berkeley, and received her J.D. degree from UC Davis.

Career

Paul Manafort and Donald Trump

2016 presidential election 
In 2014, Chalupa began to research the Revolution of Dignity for a pro bono client unrelated to the DNC. The research included Paul Manafort, his work for Ukrainian president Viktor Yanukovych, and his connections to pro-Russian oligarchs. After Donald Trump launched his presidential campaign in 2015, she expanded her research to include Trump and his ties to Russia.

She began warning Ukrainian-American community leaders in January 2016 that Manafort was Russian president Vladimir Putin’s "political brain for manipulating U.S. foreign policy and elections." She also shared her concerns with a senior DNC official, saying that a connection between the Trump campaign and Russia would likely mean Manafort would become involved in the election. Near the end of March, she visited the Ukrainian embassy in Washington, D.C., to organize an event in June highlighting female Ukrainian leaders. While there, she shared her concerns with Ambassador Valeriy Chaly and his aide Oksana Shulyar.

Manafort joined the Trump campaign a few days later as its convention manager. The day after the campaign announced  Manafort's joining, Chalupa briefed the DNC's communications staff on Manafort's and Trump's ties to Russia.  A week later, Chalupa met with a foreign policy legislative assistant to Representative Marcy Kaptur in a failed attempt to start a congressional investigation into Manafort's activities.

After the election, Chalupa assisted the Clinton campaign with their efforts to force vote recounts in some states.

On September 14, 2016, Chalupa was interviewed by an agent from the FBI.

Ukrainian embassy 
The Ukrainian embassy assisted Chalupa with her research, though the extent and nature of the assistance are in dispute. According to Politico, the DNC encouraged Chalupa to ask the Ukrainian embassy to arrange a call with Ukrainian president Petro Poroshenko to discuss Manafort, Trump, and their connections to Russia, but the embassy declined.

Andrii Telizhenko, who worked in the embassy as third secretary under Shulyar at the time, told Politico that she asked him to pass on to Chalupa any information he came across about connections between Trump, Manafort, and Russia. He claimed the embassy was coordinating with Chalupa and the Clinton campaign on investigating Manafort. In 2018, Telizhenko told the Ukrainian news site Strana.UA that Poroshenko worked with Chalupa to discredit Trump. He began repeating the story in 2019 to U.S. right-wing media, Trump's personal lawyer Rudy Giuliani, and House Intelligence Committee minority chair Devin Nunes. Ukrainian lawmaker Oleg Voloshyn also accused Poroshenko and Chaly of favoring the Clinton campaign and called for an investigation into the alleged cooperation between Chalupa and the Ukrainian Embassy.  Both the embassy and Chalupa disputed the allegations. Ambassador Chaly denied any wrongdoing and called Telizhenko a liar. In a written statement to The Hill, Chaly admitted Chalupa had approached the embassy and tried to push the investigation of Manafort’s dealings in Ukraine, but Chaly claimed the embassy didn’t cooperate with her.

Chalupa denied that the DNC asked her to collect information from the embassy.

Intimidation campaign 
In late April 2016, Chalupa began receiving daily administrative alerts from Yahoo! warning her that state actors were attempting to break into her email account. After two weeks of daily alerts, she informed the DNC about the hacking attempts. That email became public when WikiLeaks published stolen DNC emails in July. The alerts continued into 2017.

In June 2016, someone broke into and searched her car, but left everything behind. She became convinced it was Russia-linked when two more family cars were broken into and ransacked but nothing was stolen. A few days later, a woman "wearing white flowers in her hair" tried to break into Chalupa's home. She mentioned the incident to Shulyar, who told her it resembled intimidation campaigns used against foreigners in Russia.

Chalupa began receiving death threats in the second half of 2016.

FEC complaints 

The conservative watchdog group Foundation for Accountability and Civic Trust filed a complaint against Chalupa and the DNC with the Federal Election Commission (FEC) in August 2017. The complaint alleges that the research assistance the Ukrainian embassy provided to her during the 2016 election campaign was an illegal campaign contribution to the DNC because of her work for them at the time.

The pro-Trump super PAC Committee to Defend the President filed a similar FEC complaint against the DNC in September 2019, alleging that the DNC ordered Chalupa to investigate Manafort and Trump. Like the 2017 complaint, it is largely a mischaracterization of the 2017 Politico article detailing her research efforts.

Calls for DOJ investigation 
U.S. Senator Chuck Grassley urged the Department of Justice (DOJ) on two occasions to investigate alleged coordination between Chalupa and the Ukrainian government to interfere in the 2016 election. In July 2017, he sent a letter in his capacity as chairman of the Senate Judiciary Committee. Chalupa denied the claims, saying that she acted as a part time consultant in 2016, and that she was never asked by DNC officials to “go to the Ukrainian Embassy to collect information.” She did admit to meeting with representatives of the Ukrainian Embassy, but claimed that these meetings had to do with “Immigrant Heritage Month women’s networking event." Grassley and Senator Ron Johnson sent a second letter in September 2019 in their capacities as the chairs of the Senate Finance and Homeland Security Committees. Both letters cite the 2017 Politico article as evidence.

Impeachment Inquiry 
During the US Congress' 2019 Impeachment Inquiry hearings,  House Intelligence Committee ranking member Devin Nunes several times cited Alexandra Chalupa as a fact witness that committee chairman Adam Schiff refused to bring before the committee.  Chalupa responded that she would welcome the opportunity to testify and push back against the Republican narrative about her involvement with Ukrainian officials.

See also
Russian interference in the 2016 United States elections

References

Living people
Democratic National Committee people
People associated with Russian interference in the 2016 United States elections
American people of Ukrainian descent
21st-century American lawyers
University of California, Davis alumni
University of California, Berkeley alumni
Year of birth missing (living people)